Gare is the word for "station" in French and related languages, commonly meaning railway station

Gare can refer to:

People
 Gare (surname), surname
 The Gare Family, fictional characters in the novel Wild Geese by Martha Ostenso

Places
 Gare, Zavidovići, Bosnia and Herzegovina
 Gare (Gadžin Han), a village situated in Gadžin Han municipality in Serbia
 Garé, Hungary
 Gare, Luxembourg, neighborhood around the railway station in Luxembourg City, Luxembourg
 Gare Loch, an open see loch in Argyll and Bute, Scotland
 Pompoï-gare, Pompoï-gare is a village in the Pompoï Department of Balé Province in southern Burkina Faso
 South Gare, an area of reclaimed land and breakwater on the southern side of the mouth of the River Tees in Redcar and Cleveland, England
 South Gare & Coatham Sands SSSI, Site of Special Scientific Interest
 South Gare Lighthouse, at the end of the South Gare breakwater

Transportation
Gare refers to many stations in Francophone and other countries, including:

Africa
 Gare d'Alger, main railway station in Algers, Algeria
 Gare Casa-Voyageurs, main railway station in Casablanca, Morocco
 Gare de Casa-Port, railway terminal in the port of Casablanca
 Gare de Tunis, also Tunis Gare Centrale, the main railway station in Tunis, Tunisia
 Gare Mahdia, railway station in Mahdia, Tunisia

Americas
 Gare centrale de Montréal, main railway station in Montréal, Quebec, Canada
 Gare du Palais, main railway station in Quebec City, Quebec, Canada
 Gare d'autocars de Montréal, major bus station in Montréal, Quebec, Canada

Europe

Belgium
 Gare de Bruxelles-Central, central station of Brussels
 Gare de Bruxelles-Midi, largest railway station in Belgium
 Gare de Bruxelles-Nord, commonly known as Gare du Nord, 3rd largest in Belgium

France
 Gare du Nord, Paris, officially Gare de Paris-Nord, the largest railway station in Europe
 Gare du Nord, busiest subway station on the Paris Métro

Luxembourg
 Gare de Luxembourg, main railway station in Luxembourg

Portugal
 Gare do Oriente, main international intermodal transport hub, Lisbon

Other uses
 Gare-fowl, alternative English name for the Great Auk

See also
 Gare Centrale (disambiguation)
 Gare du Nord (disambiguation)
 Gares
 Garesh